Superchick, originally known as Superchic[k], was an American Christian alternative pop/rock band. Their music incorporated various styles such as pop, punk, rock, rap, and R&B. Their sound has been compared to mainstream artists like No Doubt and Avril Lavigne only with a heavier sound. Superchick has had five songs reach No. 1 on music charts, and their song "Stand in the Rain" held the No. 1 spot for nine weeks on R&R Christian Hit Radio (CHR) chart in 2006/2007.

History

1999: Debut 
Superchick made their debut in 1999 at an Audio Adrenaline concert in front of an audience of 5,000. They continued to perform at live events throughout that year.

Early 2000s: Karaoke Superstars and Last One Picked
Superchick self-released their first album in 2000. The album was re-released with three added remix tracks after they signed to Inpop Records, and became their first official album: Karaoke Superstars. Since then, their music has appeared in several movies and television shows, including the 2001 movie Legally Blonde, the 2002 made for TV Disney movie Cadet Kelly, and the 2009 movie To Save a Life. Last One Picked was released on October 8, 2002.

Mid-2000s: Beauty from Pain
Superchick signed with mainstream record label Columbia Records to promote their 2005 album Beauty from Pain, resulting in their 2006 mainstream debut Beauty from Pain 1.1. The re-release album contains their signature hit "Stand in the Rain". Their music has received favorable reviews in both Christian and mainstream publications.

Late 2000s: Grammy nomination and Rock What You Got

On December 4, 2008, Superchick was nominated for their first Grammy Award. The group was recognized in the category of "Best Rock Or Rap Gospel Album" for their 2008 album, Rock What You Got which was featured on ABC Family's Make It or Break It. The band launched their "Hey! Hey! (That's Freedom You Hear)" Tour on April 3, 2009.

2010s: Temporary hiatus and death of Lovelace
On June 7, 2011, lead singer Tricia Brock released her debut solo album entitled The Road.

The group announced that former member Chase Lovelace had died. The memorial took place on May 11, 2013. Matt Dally confirmed that "he [Lovelace] is on the new record". On May 28, 2013, the band posted "This is the Time" written in memory of Lovelace.

2013: Disbandment
On August 11, 2013, Superchick announced on their Facebook page that the band had reached its closing chapter.

In the post, Max Hsu stated: "Everyone has new stories to write: Tricia has another solo record coming out, Dave is touring with Audio Adrenaline, Melissa started Rosebuds East, Matt is busy being a realtor/songwriter/daddy daycare and I've got plenty of projects to finish up, including a ThumpMonks record years in the making". He also confirmed the release of five new tracks in the future featuring Chase Lovelace.

2016: Reunion
On June 27, 2016, a photo was posted of the band rehearsing for an upcoming reunion show. The band then performed at Lifest on July 9, 2016, which featured the line-up of Tricia Brock, Max Hsu, Dave Ghazarian, Matt Dally, Andy Vegas and Brandon Estelle. In an interview at the show posted on YouTube, Brock said that they were asked to perform one last show at the site of their first show. The show was a one-off and also considered as a final concert for the band. It was later posted on Facebook Live.

Members

Final line-up 
 Tricia Baumhardt – lead vocals (1999–2013, 2016)
 Dave Ghazarian – lead guitar (1999–2013, 2016)
 Matt Dally – bass guitar, rap vocals, keyboards (1999–2013, 2016)
 Max Hsu – DJ, keyboards (1999–2013, 2016)
 Andy Vegas – percussion (1999–2001, 2016)
 Brandon Estelle – drums (2004–2009, 2016)

Former members
 Justin Sharbono – guitar (1999–2002)
 Ben Dally – drums (1999–2001)
 Brian Fitch – drums (2002–2003)
 Aaron Tosti – drums (2004)
 Clayton Hunt – drums (2009–2010)
 Chase Lovelace – drums (2010–2012, died 2013)
 Dave Clo – bass guitar, acoustic guitar (2002–2003, 2012)
 Melissa Brock – rhythm guitar, harmony vocals (1999–2011, 2013)

Discography

Studio albums
 Karaoke Superstars (2001)
 Last One Picked (2002)
 Beauty from Pain (2005)
 Rock What You Got (2008)

References

Christian punk groups
Christian rock groups from Illinois
Inpop Records artists
Musical groups from Chicago
Musical groups established in 1999
Musical groups disestablished in 2013
Columbia Records artists
1999 establishments in Illinois